Wolfram Kurschat (born 17 May 1975 in Werne, North Rhine-Westphalia) is a German professional mountain biker. He has claimed two German national championship titles each in men's cross-country and marathon races (2007 and 2013), and later represented his nation Germany at the 2008 Summer Olympics. Kurschat currently trains and races for the 2013 season on Topeak-Ergon Racing Team, since he turned himself professional on the international scene in 2008.

Kurschat qualified for the German squad, along with his teammates Manuel Fumic and Moritz Milatz, in the men's cross-country race at the 2008 Summer Olympics in Beijing, by finishing third from the German Championships and by receiving one of the nation's three available berths from the German Cycling Federation and the Union Cycliste Internationale (UCI), based on his best performance at the World Cup series, World and European Championships, and Mountain Biking World Series. Kurschat could not upgrade a much stellar ride to complete a 4.8-km cross-country race course, as he decided to pull himself off from the race with only two laps left and a thirty-third-place effort because of bike problems.

Career achievements

2004
 2nd German MTB Championships (Cross-country), Germany
2005
 3rd German MTB Championships (Cross-country), Albstadt (GER)
2007
 1st  German MTB Championships (Cross-country), Germany
 1st Cyprus Mountain Bike Cup, Larnaca (CYP)
 8th Stage 5, UCI World Cup (Cross-country), Saint-Félicien, Quebec (CAN)
 29th UCI World Championships (Cross-country), Fort William (GBR)
2008
 1st  German MTB Championships (Marathon), Germany
 3rd German MTB Championships (Cross-country), Germany
 33rd Olympic Games (Cross-country), Beijing (CHN)
2009
 1st  German MTB Championships (Cross-country), Germany
  Stage 2, UCI World Cup (Cross-country), Offenburg (GER)
  Stage 3, UCI World Cup (Cross-country), Houffalize (BEL)
 5th Stage 1, UCI World Cup (Cross-country), Pietermaritzburg (RSA)
 10th Stage 8, UCI World Cup (Cross-country), Schladming (AUT)
 12th Stage 4, UCI World Cup (Cross-country), Madrid (ESP)
2010
 2nd German MTB Championships (Cross-country), Albstadt (GER)
  Stage 2, UCI World Cup (Cross-country), Houffalize (BEL)
 9th Stage 3, UCI World Cup (Cross-country), Offenburg (GER)
2012
 4th German MTB Championships (Cross-country), Germany
2013
 1st  German MTB Championships (Cross-country, ITT), Bad Salzdetfurth (GER)
 2nd German MTB Championships (Cross-country), Bad Salzdetfurth (GER)
 35th UCI World Championships (Cross-country), Pietermaritzburg (RSA)

References

External links
 
NBC 2008 Olympics profile

1975 births
Living people
German male cyclists
Cross-country mountain bikers
Cyclists at the 2008 Summer Olympics
Olympic cyclists of Germany
People from Werne
Sportspeople from Arnsberg (region)
Cyclists from North Rhine-Westphalia
German mountain bikers